Hyuganatsu (Citrus tamurana, Japanese: 日向夏) is a citrus fruit and plant grown in Japan. The name comes from Hyūga, the ancient name of Miyazaki Prefecture in Kyushu, where the citrus is said to have originated, while  means summer.

Origin
A hyūganatsu sapling was said to have been found in a Miyazaki garden sometime in the 1820s, after which it became widely cultivated throughout the region. It is theorized to be either a mutated yuzu or perhaps more likely, a chance hybrid between yuzu and pomelo.

Description
The fruit is of medium size and its shape is round to slightly oblong. When ripe, it turns a light yellow. Its flesh is juicy and sweet with a slightly sour taste. It is usually eaten cut up, sprinkled with sugar and with most of its rather thick pith intact.

The fruit's oil is higher than other citrus fruits in trans-β-farnesene, l-carvone, and has a higher number of ketones.

See also
Amanatsu
Japanese citrus
Ōgonkan

Notes

References
Hyuga Natsu  at Citrus Variety Collection
Hyuganatsu orange (Citrus tamurana Hort. Ex Tanaka) contains a water soluble substance that suppresses bone loss in ovariectomized rats.
Effects of storage conditions on the composition of Citrus tamurana Hort. ex Tanaka (hyuganatsu) essential oil

External links

 The Flying Kitchen

Citrus
Fruits originating in East Asia
Japanese fruit